Marc Singer (born January 29, 1948) is a Canadian-born American actor best known for his roles in the Beastmaster film series, as Mike Donovan in the original 1980s TV series V, and as Matt Cantrell in Dallas.

Early life
Singer was born in Vancouver, British Columbia and raised in Corpus Christi, Texas. He has two brothers (Claude and Gregory) and one sister, Lori, an actress. His father, Jacques Singer, was a symphony conductor; his mother, Leslie (née Wright), a concert pianist; and his sister, Lori, is an actress and cellist. Singer is of Jewish descent.

Career
Before the height of his career, Singer appeared in the sequel to the miniseries Roots as Col. Warner's elder son Andy. He had originally auditioned for the role Jim Warner, but the producers felt he was better suited for the Andy Warner role.

In the 1970s, Singer had a small breakthrough role in the Planet of the Apes TV series playing a gladiator.  

He found fame in the early '80s with the movie The Beastmaster and its sequels, in which he played the title role, Dar, and as Mike Donovan in the 1983 miniseries V, the 1984 sequel V: The Final Battle, and the TV series V: The Series.

Other roles include the 1982 film If You Could See What I Hear (where he portrayed blind musician Tom Sullivan), Body Chemistry, Something for Joey (as football star John Cappelletti), Watchers II, High Desert Kill, The Fighter, Go Tell the Spartans and Dead Space, as well as General Klaus Von Kraut in A Man Called Sarge.

Singer voiced the character of Man-Bat on Batman: The Animated Series. He has guest-starred on television series, such as Barnaby Jones, where he played in the episode titled “Trap Play” (01/07/1975). This is a role he played alongside Nick Nolte in the earlier years. He also appeared in another episode of Barnaby Jones, titled “Price of Terror” (10/10/75). He also starred as Matt Cantrell in season nine ("the dream season") of Dallas; The Twilight Zone; The Hitchhiker; Simon & Simon; Murder, She Wrote; The Young and the Restless; The Ray Bradbury Theater and Highlander: The Series.

Singer is active in theater and played Petruchio in the American Conservatory Theater (A.C.T.) production of Shakespeare's Taming of the Shrew, as well as Christian in Cyrano de Bergerac. Both Taming of the Shrew and Cyrano were filmed.

Singer appeared in the last episode of season 2 of the new version of V, airing on March 15, 2011; however, instead of reprising his role of Mike Donovan, he plays a new character called Lars Tremont. He was in a recurring role as General Matthew Shrieve on The CW television series Arrow's third season.

Personal life
He married Hawaiian-born actress Haunani Minn in 1974. She died in November 2014.

Filmography

Film

Television

References 

2. Demetria Fulton; previewed Marc Singer on Barnaby Jones, in the episode titled “Trap Play”(01/07/1975). Marc Singer also appeared in another episode of Barnaby Jones, titled “Price of Terror”(10/10/1975).

External links
 
 
 Saving the World's All in a Day's Work for Marc Singer

1948 births
Male actors from Vancouver
American male film actors
American male soap opera actors
American male stage actors
American male television actors
American male voice actors
Living people
People from Corpus Christi, Texas
20th-century American male actors
21st-century American male actors
American people of Jewish descent